Daryl Thomas Fordyce (born 2 January 1987) is a Northern Irish retired professional footballer who played as a midfielder.

Club career

Early career
Fordyce played for St Andrews and Lisburn Youth in Northern Ireland, winning major trophies with both teams when he was younger. He later joined Portsmouth. Working his way up through the club's youth ranks, Fordyce spent the second half of the 2005–06 season on loan at AFC Bournemouth before going back to Portsmouth.

Glentoran
In July 2007, he signed for Glentoran in Northern Ireland. At the beginning of the Irish League 2010/11 season he scored five goals against Lisburn Distillery in the first game of the season in a 6-1 win. Fordyce agreed a deal with Linfield just after the end of 2010/11 season, although he was in contract re-negotiations with Glentoran.

Linfield
In 2012, Fordyce won the league title with Linfield after defeating Portadown 2–1 on 7 April. The team also won the Irish Cup for a record 42nd time, defeating Crusaders 4–1 in the final. Though Fordyce did not score in the final, he did score in Linfield's 5-1 defeat over Carrick Rangers.

FC Edmonton
On 18 January 2013, it was announced that Fordyce, along with his teammate Albert Watson, would not return to Linfield in the following season, instead seeking new playing opportunities in Canada. On 25 February 2013, it was reported that both would join FC Edmonton. After four seasons in Edmonton, Fordyce left the club as its all-time leading scorer, a title which he still holds to this day.

FC Cincinnati
The United Soccer League club FC Cincinnati announced that it had signed Fordyce on 16 January 2017. After little playing time with FC Cincinnati, Fordyce was released by the club in June 2017.

Return to Edmonton
Shortly after, Fordyce re-signed with FC Edmonton. After the 2017 season, with the future of FC Edmonton and the NASL in doubt, Fordyce was released from FC Edmonton.

Sligo Rovers
On 8 February 2019, Fordyce signed a one-year contract with the League of Ireland Premier Division side Sligo Rovers. That season, he made 29 league appearances, scoring two goals, while making two appearances in the FAI Cup and one in the League of Ireland Cup.

Valour FC
On 10 January 2020, Fordyce signed with the Canadian Premier League side Valour FC. He made his debut for Valour in their season opener on August 16 against Cavalry FC. He scored his first goal for Valour against his former club FC Edmonton on August 29, helping his team to a 2–1 victory. Fordyce retired from professional football in January 2023.

International career
Fordyce has represented Northern Ireland at Under-19 level, scoring both goals in the 2–1 European U19 Championship victory over Moldova in October 2005. He also scored four goals for Northern Ireland U-19 against Serbia & Montenegro.

He has made five appearances for the Northern Ireland national under-21 football team, scoring against Germany in November 2006.

Career statistics

References

External links

 BBC profile 
 
 
 NIFG profile

1987 births
Living people
Association football forwards
Association footballers from Northern Ireland
Association footballers from Belfast
Expatriate association footballers from Northern Ireland
Expatriate footballers in England
Expatriate soccer players in Canada
Expatriate sportspeople from Northern Ireland in Canada
Expatriate soccer players in the United States
Expatriate sportspeople from Northern Ireland in the United States
Expatriate association footballers in the Republic of Ireland
Portsmouth F.C. players
AFC Bournemouth players
Glentoran F.C. players
Linfield F.C. players
FC Edmonton players
FC Cincinnati (2016–18) players
Sligo Rovers F.C. players
Valour FC players
English Football League players
North American Soccer League players
USL Championship players
League of Ireland players
Canadian Premier League players
Northern Ireland under-21 international footballers